WXWZ-LD (channel 23), branded on-air as MásTVPR, is a independent television station licensed to Guayama, Puerto Rico. The station is owned by the JB Media Group. WXWZ-LD serves Caguas and the entire central area. WXWZ-LD's programming was seen on Liberty Cable channel 22, OneLink Communications channel 121 and Choice Cable channel 27. WXWZ-LD produces over 40 hours of locally produced programming that includes: News, Sports and general entertainment. The station's studios are located at Degetau Avenue in Caguas with its transmitter located at Cerro La Santa in Cayey near the Bosque Estatal de Carite mountain reserve.

History
The station was founded on November 2, 1990 as W22AX by Juan Papotito Rosario (currently serves as owner of WOLA 1380 AM & Buena TV) and Fernando Jimenez (stockholder of Borinquen Broadcasting). W22AX is the first low power television station founded in Puerto Rico. The station is currently owned by JB Media Group, managed by Jose Berrios. First known as "Canal 22", in 1995 it was known as "Telecentro". Some famous Puerto Rican news reporters worked at W22AX in the early 1990s, such as Mario Vega (later at NotiUno, now deceased), Jose Raul Arriaga (later at WAPA, Dando Candela in WKAQ-TV and currently owns Red Informativa de Puerto Rico , a Radio News Agency), Jose Santiago (Public affairs Mun of Cidra and WAPA-TV), Jesus Rodriguez García (later at WSKN, currently owns Radio Acromatica, a web station), Jose R. Gomez (El Pueblo Quiere Saber), Braulio Rodriguez (Musa Media Group), Jorge Antares (actor), Angel Irizarry and Nestor Rodriguez (formerly in WKUM AM 1470). W22AX then changed its call letters to WXWZ-LP in 2000, and then WXWZ-LD in 2011 when the station switched to digital.

Digital channels
The station's digital signal is multiplexed:

Local programs produced by WXWZ-LD

Current
 Más TV Noticias
 De Bohemia con Willie Benito
 Entre Tu y Yo
 Artes Marciales en Acción
 De To' Un Poco
 Pal Pueblo
 Donde Esta Katty
 Locura Colectiva  
 La Palabra de Dios en tu Hogar
 Zona Zaguera
 Geek Spot
 Es Tiempo de Viajar

Former
 El Pueblo Quiere Saber
 Noticiero Regional
 Asistencia Medica
 Open House
 Mech Tech Racing
 Borinqueando
 Dra. Mama
 100 x 35

References

External links
 MásTVPR

Television channels and stations established in 1990
XWZ-LD
Guayama, Puerto Rico
1990 establishments in Puerto Rico